Ben Lewis (born 28 September 1979) is an Australian actor and singer. His credits include The Phantom in the original Australian production of Andrew Lloyd Webber's Love Never Dies as well as in The Phantom of the Opera in the West End production.

Childhood 
Lewis was born in London to a theatrical family. His father, Michael Lewis, is an opera singer and his mother, Patricia Price, was also an opera singer and has retired as Head of Vocal Studies and Opera at the Western Australian Academy of Performing Arts. His brother, Alexander Lewis, is an opera singer and actor who completed three years as a young artist at New York’s Metropolitan Opera. During his childhood, his family went back and forth between England and the North Shore of Sydney, Australia.

Education 
After starting at a British secondary school, the family moved back to Australia and Lewis graduated from Newington College in Sydney and then undertook an Arts Degree at Sydney University. He performed with the Australian Theatre for Young People and was awarded a Lend Lease scholarship to further his studies overseas, where he studied voice at the Royal College of Music. Upon returning to Australia, Lewis applied to study at the Western Australian Academy of Performing Arts (WAAPA) with his brother and both were successful. It was during his time at WAAPA that Lewis met his wife, actress Melle Stewart. The leading Australian performer Tony Sheldon was a visiting Director during Lewis’s time at WAAPA and Lewis credits Sheldon for helping him through his student years.

Personal life 
Lewis is married to Australian actress Melle Stewart.

Career

Theatre credits

Film and television credits

Awards and nominations 
In 2012, Ben Lewis received a nomination for Helpmann Award and won a Judith Johnson Award for Best Actor in Leading Role in a Musical at the 2012 Sydney Theatre Awards for his role of the Phantom in Love Never Dies.

References

External links 
 
 Ben Lewis on StageFaves

1979 births
Male actors from London
English male stage actors
Living people
People educated at Newington College